The Grand River (Ottawa: Owashtanong, "Far-Flowing Water") is a river in the southwestern portion of the southern peninsula of Michigan, United States, that flows into Lake Michigan's southeastern shore. It is the longest river in Michigan, running  from its headwaters in Hillsdale County on the southern border north to Lansing and west to its mouth on the Lake at Grand Haven.

The river was famous for its mile-long, 300-yard-wide, and 10-to-15-foot-tall rapids, for which the city of Grand Rapids was named. These rapids were submerged following the construction of numerous dams, starting in 1835, and flooding of areas behind the dams. The river has not had any rapids for nearly a century.

Course

The headwaters of the Grand River begin from natural springs in Somerset Township in Hillsdale County near the boundary with Liberty Township in Jackson County. From there, the river flows through Jackson, Ingham, Eaton, Clinton, Ionia, Kent, and Ottawa counties before emptying into Lake Michigan.  The river runs through the cities of Jackson, Eaton Rapids, Lansing, Grand Ledge, Portland, Ionia, Lowell, Grand Rapids, and Grand Haven.

Hydrology
The Grand River is one of three major tributaries of Lake Michigan, including the Fox River (Green Bay tributary) on the western shore, and Kalamazoo River on the southeastern shore.  It falls in elevation from 1260 ft. in the highlands of its headwaters to 577 ft. at its mouth on Lake Michigan. Its waters drain northward through the lake, then south and east through the Great Lakes waterways into the St. Lawrence River, which flows northeasterly into the Gulf of St. Lawrence on the Atlantic Ocean. The Grand River discharges an estimated average .

Much of the basin is flat, and it contains many swamps and lakes. The basin is composed of four sub-basins: Upper Grand, Lower Grand, Thornapple, and Maple, where the four major tributaries flow: the Flat, Rogue, Thornapple, and Maple rivers.

Tributaries of the river include (beginning near river source and travelling downstream): Portage River, Red Cedar River, Looking Glass River, Maple River, Prairie Creek, Bellamy Creek, Flat River, Thornapple River, Rogue River, Coldbrook Creek, Plaster Creek, Bass River, Buck Creek and Crockery Creek.

Dams
There are fourteen dams on the main branch of the Grand River. Some 218 dams were built on its tributaries; these have divided the ecosystem into a set of dysfunctional local streams. 228 of these dams are registered with the Michigan Department of Environmental Quality.

The main branch dams are:

lower
Grand River (6th Street)
Grand River

middle
Lyons (removed in 2016)
Grand Ledge
Portland
North Lansing
Webber (hydroelectric)

upper
State Street
Moore's Park (hydroelectric)
Sanitation
Smithville (hydroelectric)

headwaters
Liberty Mills
Crystal Lake
Mirror Lake
Lake LeAnn North
Lake LeAnn South

Ecology
It is estimated that 22% of the pesticide usage in the Lake Michigan watershed occurs in the Grand River drainage, which accounts for only 13% of the lake's total watershed. The river is a trout and salmon stream for much of its length.

History
As the glacial ice receded from what is the central Lower Peninsula of Michigan around 11,000 years ago, the Maple River and lower Grand River served as a drainage channel for the meltwater. The channel ran east to west, emptying into proglacial Lake Chicago, the ancestor of Lake Michigan.

About 2,000 years ago, the Hopewell Indians settled along the Grand River near present-day Grandville. Their presence is still seen in the preserved burial mounds.

By the late 17th century, the Grand River band of Odawa had established villages on the banks of the Grand River at the sites of what would later become several towns and cities, including Grand Rapids, Forest Hills, Lowell, Lyons, and Portland.  For these peoples, as well as for later explorers, fur traders and settlers, the river served as an important navigational trade route and cultural hub.

The river formed part of a major demarcation of land ceded by Native Americans enabling U.S. settlers to legally obtain title to land in the area. In the 1821 Treaty of Chicago, the Odawa, Ojibwe, and Potawatomi ceded to the United States all lands in Michigan Territory south of the Grand River, with the exception of several small reservations.

The city of Grand Rapids was built starting in 1826 on the site of a mile long rapids 40 miles upstream from the river's mouth, although these disappeared after the installation of a run-of-river dam in 1866 and five low-rise dams during a river beautification project in 1927. 

The Grand was important to the rapid development of West-Central Michigan during the 1850s to 1880s, as logs from Michigan's rich pine and oak forests floated down the Grand River for milling. After the Civil War, many soldiers found jobs as lumberjacks cutting logs and guiding them down the river with pike poles, peaveys, and cant hooks. The men wore bright red flannel, felt clothes, and spiked boots to hold them onto the floating logs; these boots chewed up the wooden sidewalks and flooring of the local bars, leading one hotel owner to supply carpet slippers to all river drivers who entered his hotel. The "jacks" earned $1 to $3 per day and all the "vittles" they could eat, which was usually a considerable amount.

In 1883, heavy rains during June and July brought water levels on the river to record highs. The flooding was bad enough, but the rising water overwhelmed lumbering booms—river enclosures used to sort and organize logs for transport to saw mills—in Lowell, Grand Rapids as well as Grand Haven and Robinson townships.  As water rose, the logs escaped the enclosures, much like cattle fleeing stockyards.  Soon, Kent and Ottawa counties had a 'stampede', as millions of logs flowed uncontrolled down the river and became trapped in bends or against bridges. The result was a logjam of incredible proportions that clogged the river for 47 miles (10 million Feet of logs trapped in Lowell, 95 million Feet of logs trapped in the "Big Bend" northeast of Grand Rapids, 80 million Feet of logs trapped in Ottawa County).

Grand River Avenue (or Grand River Road) was built early in the settlement of Michigan and ran from the head of navigation on the Grand to downtown Detroit. It formed an important part of an early route between Chicago and Detroit, along with the Grand itself, from Grand Rapids to Grand Haven on Lake Michigan.

A fish ladder installed in 1974 replaced the West Side Water Power Canal headgates removed in 1960. In recent years, Grand Rapids Whitewater, a private nonprofit organization, is working toward restoring the rapids to the river in Grand Rapids. The project, which began in 2019, will remove five dams between Sixth street and Pearl street to restore an 18-foot drop in the Grand River's elevation.

Points of interest
Two of Grand Valley State University's campuses are located on the banks of the Grand River. The main campus in Allendale and the Pew Grand Rapids campus in Grand Rapids both border the river in separate locations miles from each other. The Grand is home to GVSU's rowing team, and the crew boathouse sits parallel to the river on the Allendale campus's north side.

Coast Guard Station Grand Haven is situated near the mouth of the river in Grand Haven. The station gives Grand Haven its nickname Coast Guard City USA.

Parks, docks and recreational facilities
Millennium Park (Grand Rapids), the largest park in western Michigan, larger than Central Park, NY

Crossings
At least 80 bridges cross the river's 250-mile span, with most bridge structures clustered in metropolitan/municipal areas along the river.  County road and state highway crossings can be found in less densely populated areas along the waterway:

See also

 List of Michigan rivers

References

External links

Rivers of Michigan
Tributaries of Lake Michigan
Geography of Grand Rapids, Michigan
Geography of Lansing, Michigan
Rivers of Hillsdale County, Michigan
Rivers of Jackson County, Michigan
Rivers of Ingham County, Michigan
Rivers of Eaton County, Michigan
Rivers of Clinton County, Michigan
Rivers of Ionia County, Michigan
Rivers of Kent County, Michigan
Rivers of Ottawa County, Michigan
Rivers with fish ladders